The Gomidas Institute (GI) is an independent academic institution "dedicated to modern Armenian and regional studies."  Its activities include research, publications and educational programmes. It publishes documents, monographs, memoirs and other works on modern Armenian history and organizes lectures and conferences.  The institute was founded in 1992 at the University of Michigan in Ann Arbor. It is based in London and maintains a United States branch in Cleveland. British-Armenian historian Ara Sarafian serves as its executive director.  Since 1998, the institute has been publishing a quarterly journal titled Armenian Forum. The institute is named after Komitas (Gomidas in Western Armenian pronunciation).

Noteworthy publications

Ottoman/Turkish Armenia and the Armenian genocide

Russian/Soviet/Post-Soviet Armenia and the Caucasus

Armenian Literature

Armenian Art and Architecture

Kurds and Kurdistan

See also
 Armenian studies

References

External links
 Gomidas Institute Website

Academic organisations based in the United Kingdom
1992 establishments in Michigan
Armenian studies